Seneca Meadows, owned by Seneca Meadows, Inc. (SMI) is a landfill in Seneca Falls, New York, near Town of Waterloo, with almost  of landfill and a  facility. It is the largest active landfill in New York State, as well as Seneca County's fourth largest industrial employer. At peak times, the company employs more than 160 full-time workers. In 2005, it accepted more than 6,000 tons of garbage a day from multiple states (then three). Methane gas is sent to a nearby independent facility for producing electricity, some of which Seneca Meadows buys back for its own power needs. Seneca Meadows began producing gas for electricity in 1995, then producing 2.4 Megawatts. Today it produces 18 Megawatts, enough to power 15,000 to 18,000 homes. Seneca Meadows parent company, IESI Corporation, claims that the revenue of the landfill is around $48 million.

History
The landfill accepts trash from New York, Massachusetts, Connecticut, New Jersey and Pennsylvania. It will continue its operation through at least 2023.

The site was first created in 1953 and owned by the Tantalo Construction. Tantalo Construction was later purchased and the corporation's name was changed to Seneca Meadows Inc. Seneca Meadows Inc. was later purchased by Canadian company IESI.

Seneca Meadows recycles about two million tires a year, making it one of the largest tire recyclers in the country. The tires are chopped up and the chips used in place of stone for drainage.

In 2007, a  expansion was added that was estimated to provide 14 years of landfilling.

In 2009, Seneca Meadows opened its Environmental Education Center, a LEED Gold Certified building, which uses geothermal heat. Environmental related courses and labs for area schools are held there by the Audubon Society staff. The building was part of a wetland creation project which the landfill was required to do because natural wetland was taken by the landfill during expansion. The amount and extensiveness of the wetland created, however, was far beyond the minimum requirement, exceeding 1,000 acres in total.

In a pre-election event in 2010, New York State Senate challenger Edward O'Shea questioned his Republican opponent Mike Nozzolio for accepting a $4,000 campaign donation from Seneca Meadows. Nozzolio won re-election.

In 2015, a US$3.3 billion, 20-year contract to haul trash to Seneca Meadows from New York City by train moved towards approval. A railyard would be built adjacent the landfill to replace many of the current 50 trucks a day, carrying 1,415 tons, with approximately 30-car trains.

References

External links

Landfills in the United States
Waste power stations in the United States
Seneca County, New York
Waterloo, New York
Waste management infrastructure of New York (state)